Jack L. Rives (born 1952) is a former American military officer and the current executive director and chief operating officer of the American Bar Association, and a former TJAG ("The Judge Advocate General") of the United States Air Force Judge Advocate General's Corps. In 2008, he became the first Judge Advocate General in any service to hold the rank of lieutenant general. He served in the U.S. Air Force from 1977 until 2010.

Background
Rives grew up in Rockmart, Georgia, where his family were the only Jews in a town of 4,000.  "We would go to [synagogue for] the High Holy Days... and there was curiosity among my classmates, curiosity about why I was getting out of school to go to Yom Kippur services or Rosh Hashanah." He either attended or taught Sunday school every week from the time he was 5 years old until high school.

He notes that his father was in the National Guard for a short time, but otherwise his family had no formal military "heritage."

Rives received an A.B. degree in political science from the University of Georgia in 1974 and a J.D. degree from the University of Georgia School of Law in 1976. He was a member of the Kappa Deuteron chapter of Phi Gamma Delta fraternity.  He has also been educated at the Air Command and Staff College (1983), Air War College (1990), and National War College (1993).

Air Force career

Rives received his commission through the Air Force ROTC program in 1974 and entered active duty in 1977 after receiving his J.D. degree as assistant staff judge advocate at Griffiss Air Force Base in Rome, New York. Between 1978 and 1983, he was stationed at Kunsan Air Base, Hellenikon Air Base, and Clark Air Base as a judge advocate and defense counsel. It was during his assignment at Hellenikon that he met Marie, the woman who would become his wife.

Rives worked in the Office of the Judge Advocate Generate between 1986 and 1990, was an appellate judge at the U.S. Air Force Court of Military Review between 1990 and 1992, and was the deputy legal counsel to the Chairman of the Joint Chiefs of Staff between 1993 and 1995. While in his assignment at JCS, he worked for Colin Powell and John Shalikashvili.

Rives was commandant of the Air Force Judge Advocate General School between 1995 and 1998 before returning to Washington to serve as the chief of the Air Force Executive Issues Team and staff judge advocate from 1998 to 2002.

Rives became Deputy Judge Advocate General (DJAG) and was promoted to major general in 2002. In September 2004, Maj. Gen. Thomas J. Fiscus was relieved of his duties as The Judge Advocate General (TJAG) in response to an investigation into his relationships with female subordinates, and Rives was named acting TJAG.
There was a period of over a year when the Air Force operated without an official TJAG, during which Rives continued to sign his name as DJAG, adding when necessary, "PDOT": "Performing the duties of TJAG."

In 2006, he was named TJAG of the Air Force.  In that position, he served as the legal adviser to the Chief of Staff of the Air Force, directed 2,200 judge advocates, 350 attorneys, 1,400 enlisted paralegals, and 500 civilians. The 2008 National Defense Authorization Act requires that The Judge Advocate General and Surgeon General of the Air Force and Army must each hold the rank of lieutenant general. As a result, Rives became the first Judge Advocate General in any service to serve in the grade of lieutenant general.

As deputy judge advocate general, Rives criticized Justice Department memos that authorized the President to conduct enhanced interrogation techniques as "violations of domestic criminal law" and could potentially place interrogators and the military chain of command at risk of international criminal accusations. In 2006 during a hearing on the Military Commissions Act, Rives and other senior military lawyers advised Congress to grant detainees broader legal protections, such as granting defendants access to classified evidence, than the rules proposed by the Bush administration.

JAG Corps 21
Partly as a result of problems that included the investigation of Rives's predecessor as TJAG, and partly because of the importance then-U.S. Air Force Chief of Staff T. Michael Moseley placed on the JAG Corps, Rives was given the chance to restructure and revise the corps.  His work, which included the convening of a "Keystone Leadership Summit" in 2005, and "Horizons sessions" to assess progress and course-correct as necessary, led to "JAG Corps 21," the new vision for the Judge Advocate General's Corps in the twenty-first century.

As part of the new vision for the U.S. Air Force JAG Corps, Rives was instrumental in the development of three guiding principles for the corps: Wisdom, Valor, and Justice.

American Bar Association
On April 22, 2010, Rives was named the executive director and chief operating officer of the American Bar Association. He officially began to work in his new position on May 1, the day recognized as "Law Day" by the ABA and many other legal organizations.

He replaced Henry White Jr. who resigned in 2009 with other senior staff members following a reorganization set in motion by ABA president Carolyn Lamm.

Awards and decorations

References

External links
 
 Wall Street Journal interview

Living people
People from Rockmart, Georgia
University of Georgia alumni
United States Air Force generals
Judge Advocates General of the United States Air Force
American Bar Association
National War College alumni
20th-century American Jews
1952 births
Recipients of the Legion of Merit
Recipients of the Defense Superior Service Medal
American chief operating officers
21st-century American Jews